The 2018 Nationals was the 48th Men's Nationals.  The Nationals was a team handball tournament to determine the National Champion from 2018 from the US.

Venues
The championship was played at venues at the Myrtle Beach Sports Center in Myrtle Beach, South Carolina.

Qualification

The Air Force Academy which ranked 3rd at the Wildcard Standings will not attending the competition.

Modus

First there is a playoff game between Houston Firehawks and Los Angeles THC for the last wildcard. The loser play in the Open Division

After that the eight teams are split in two pools A and B and they play a round roubin.

The last two teams per group were qualified for the 5-8th place semifinals.

The losers from the 5-8th place semis played a 7th place game and the winners the 5th place game.

The best two teams per group were qualified for the semifinals.

The losers from the semis played a small final and the winners the final.

Results

4th Wildcard Playoff

Group stage

Group A

Group B

Championship

Semifinals

Small Final

Final

Consolation

5-8th Place Semifinals

7th Place

5th Place

Final ranking

Statistics

Awards

Top scorers
Source:

All-Tournament Team

References

External links
 Tournament Results

USA Team Handball Nationals by year
Sports in Myrtle Beach, South Carolina